Western Rocks may refer to

 Western Rocks, Isles of Scilly, a group of uninhabited  islets in south-western England
 Western Rocks (Tasmania), a group of uninhabited islets in south-eastern Australia